The New England Literature Program (NELP) is an academic program run by the University of Michigan that takes place off-campus during the Spring half-term. University of Michigan faculty and other staff teach the courses, and students earn regular University of Michigan credit. The program has been in existence since 1975. NELP recently raised funds to endow a permanent directorship in the English Department to ensure NELP's continuation.

The program takes place at Camp Kabeyun on Lake Winnipesaukee in Alton Bay, New Hampshire. (The program has also been held at Camp Kehonka in Wolfeboro, New Hampshire, and at Camp Wohelo and Camp Mataponi on Sebago Lake in Maine.) NELP lasts for six and a half weeks, with 40 students and 13 staff members participating each year. In addition to formal academic work in literature and writing, staff and students offer non-credit instruction in canoeing, camping, art, and nature studies. Students also teach or co-teach classes as part of the NELP program, and several three-day hiking and camping trips round out the NELP curriculum. Students at NELP  live without cell phones, iPods, recorded music, video cameras, and email/computers.

Educational philosophy 
The course description of NELP states that, "Diverse kinds of learning are all valuable and pleasurable," suggesting that intellectual and physical challenges are often parallel with each kind of learning reinforcing the others. The program is run cooperatively: All participants belong to work groups. Work responsibilities rotate among the groups, which prepare meals, wash dishes, and clean common areas. NELP begins with a work day during which equipment is unpacked and camp set up, and it ends with another work day. The students and staff live together during the duration of NELP.

The academic program 
NELP students earn 8 hours of credit. While NELP’s academic work is said to be taught as a single integrated academic experience, the credits nonetheless appear on transcripts as three separate courses.

The program emphasizes the writings of Nathaniel Hawthorne, Ralph Waldo Emerson, Henry David Thoreau, Emily Dickinson, Frederick Douglass, Sarah Orne Jewett, Robert Frost, Galway Kinnell, Louise Glück, Ruth Stone, Wallace Stevens, Carolyn Chute and other 18th through 20th century writers of various backgrounds.

NELP offers creative writing workshops, and most writing is done in a journal. Journal writing is required and is central to NELP education. The journals are both personal and academic. The courses at NELP are graded. The academic program requires completion of a reading list, active work in the journal, and extensive participation in classes and groups.

Alumni 
The NELP program has had participants who have gone on to careers in writing and the arts. Among those are Bruce Weber and Mark Leibovich, writers for the New York Times, Ryan Walsh, poet and Writing Program Director at Vermont Studio Center, Diane Cook, formerly a producer at Public Radio International's This American Life and author of Man V. Nature, a book of short stories published in 2014 by Harper Collins, Chicago Tribune columnist Eric Zorn, and journalist and essayist Robert Fieseler, author of Tinderbox: The Untold Story of the Upstairs Lounge Fire and the Rise of Gay Liberation, winner of the 2019 Edgar Award in Best Crime among many others. Other books written by former participants in NELP include Snow Island by Katherine Towler and Voelker's Pond: A Robert Traver Legacy by Ed Wargin.

In 2018 alumna Dana Nessel was elected Attorney General of the State of Michigan.

References

University of Michigan
American writers' organizations
Culture of New England